The Tagish Lake meteorite fell at 16:43 UTC on 18 January 2000 in the Tagish Lake area in northwestern British Columbia, Canada.

History
Following the reported sighting of a fireball in southern Yukon and northern British Columbia, Canada, more than 500 fragments of the meteorite were collected from the lake's frozen surface. Post-event atmospheric photographs of the trail left by the associated fireball and U.S. Department of Defense satellite information yielded the meteor trajectory. Most of the stony, carbonaceous fragments landed on the Taku Arm of the lake, coming to rest on the lake's frozen surface. The passage of the fireball and the high-altitude explosion set off a wide array of satellite sensors as well as seismographs.

The local inhabitants described the smell in the air following the airburst as sulfurous and many first thought the blast was caused by a missile.

Meteoroid
The Tagish Lake meteoroid is estimated to have been 4 meters in diameter and 56 tonnes in weight before it entered the Earth's atmosphere. However, it is estimated that only 1.3 tonnes remained after ablation in the upper atmosphere and several fragmentation events, meaning that around 97% of the meteorite had vaporised, mainly becoming stratospheric dust that was seen as noctilucent clouds to the northwest of Edmonton at sunset, some 12 hours after the event.

Specimens
Tagish Lake is classified as a carbonaceous chondrite, type C2 ungrouped. The pieces of the Tagish Lake meteorite are dark grey to almost black in color with small light-colored inclusions, and a maximum size of ~2.3 kg.  Except for a greyish fusion crust, the meteorites have the visual appearance of a charcoal briquette. The fragments were transported in their frozen state to research facilities after they were collected by a local resident in late January, 2000. Initial studies of these fresh fragments were done in collaboration with researchers from NASA. Snowfall covered the remaining fragments until April 2000, when a search effort was mounted by researchers from the University of Calgary and University of Western Ontario. These later fragments were mostly found to have sunk into the ice by a few cm to more than 20 cm, and had to be collected out of meltwater holes, or cut in icy blocks from the frozen surface of Tagish Lake.

Fragments of the fresh, "pristine" Tagish Lake meteorite totaling more than 850 g are currently held in the collections at the Royal Ontario Museum and the University of Alberta. "Degraded" fragments from the April–May 2000 search are curated mainly at the University of Calgary and the University of Western Ontario.

Analysis and classification
Analyses have shown that Tagish Lake fragments are of a primitive type, containing unchanged stellar dust granules that may have been part of the cloud of material that created the Solar System and Sun. This meteorite shows some similarities to the two most primitive carbonaceous chondrite types, the CI and CM chondrites; it is nevertheless quite distinct from either of them. Tagish Lake has a much lower density than any other type of chondrite and is actually composed of two somewhat different rock types. The major difference between the two lithologies is in the abundance of carbonate minerals; one is poor in carbonates and the other is rich in them.

The meteorite contains an abundance of organic materials, including amino acids.  The organics in the meteorite may have originally formed in the interstellar medium and/or the solar protoplanetary disk, but were subsequently modified in the meteorites' asteroidal parent bodies.

A portion of the carbon in the Tagish Lake meteorite is contained in what are called nanodiamonds—very tiny diamond grains at most only a few micrometers in size. In fact, Tagish Lake contains more of the nanodiamonds than any other meteorite.

As with many carbonaceous chondrites, and Type 2 specimens in particular, Tagish Lake contains water. The meteorite contains water-bearing serpentinite and saponite phyllosilicates; gypsum has been found, but may be weathering of meteoritic sulfides. The water is not Earthly contamination but isotopically different from terrestrial water.

The age of the meteorite is estimated to be about 4.55 billion years thus being a remainder of the period when the solar system was formed.

Origin
Based on eyewitness accounts of the fireball caused by the incoming meteor and on the calibrated photographs of the track which it had left behind and which was visible for about half an hour, scientists have managed to calculate the orbit it followed before it impacted with Earth. Although none of the photographs captured the fireball directly, the fireball path was reconstructed from two calibrated photos taken minutes after the event, giving the entry angle. Eyewitness accounts in the vicinity of Whitehorse, Yukon accurately constrained the ground track azimuth from either side. It was found that the Tagish Lake meteorite had a pre-entry Apollo type orbit that brought it from the outer reaches of the asteroid belt. Currently, there are only eleven meteorite falls with accurately determined pre-entry orbits, based on photographs or video recordings of the fireballs themselves taken from two or more different angles.

Further study of the reflectance spectrum of the meteorite indicate that it most likely originated from 773 Irmintraud, a D-type asteroid.

Comparisons
The double, and not the expected single, plume formation of debris, as seen in video and photographs of the 2013 Chelyabinsk meteor dust trail and believed by Peter Brown to have coincided near the primary airburst location, was also pictured following the Tagish Lake fireball, and according to Brown, likely indicates where rising air quickly flowed into the center of the trail, essentially in the same manner as a moving 3D version of a mushroom cloud.

See also
 Glossary of meteoritics
 773 Irmintraud, the asteroid that the Tagish Lake meteorite most likely came from.

References

Universe: The Definitive Visual Dictionary, Robert Dinwiddie, DK Adult Publishing, (2005), pg. 222.
Mittlefehldt, D.W., (2002), Geochemistry of the ungrouped carbonaceous chondrite Tagish Lake, the anomalous CM chondrite Bells, and comparison with CI and CM chondrites, Meteoritics and Planetary Science 37: 703–712. See summary of the article.

External links
Evidence of sodium rich alkaline water in the Tagish Lake parent body and implications for amino acid synthesis and racemization
Tagish Lake meteorite contains clues as to how life may have arisen on Earth
Tagish Lake meteorite may have held early forms of life, believe scientists
Ancient rock star finds a home at the University of Alberta
Researchers' website
The Geological Society; Article/Analysis
Brief Abstract
Tagish Lake meteorite specimen pictures

Meteorites found in Canada
Planetary science
Geography of British Columbia
Geography of Yukon
Natural history of British Columbia
Natural history of Yukon
2000 in Canada
2000 in science
Collections of the Royal Ontario Museum